La Lengua Popular (The Popular Tongue) is the 17th album by Argentine musician and composer Andrés Calamaro, released by Dro Atlantic in 2007.  Its cover art was created by cartoonist Liniers. Since 2007 the album has sold 70.000 copies.

Track listing 
Los Chicos (The Guys)(Andrés Calamaro) - 3:11
Carnaval de Brasil (Brazil's Carnival)(Andrés Calamaro, Cachorro López) - 4:10
5 Minutos Más (Minibar) (5 More Minutes (Minibar))(Andrés Calamaro, Cachorro López) - 3:34
Soy Tuyo (I'm Yours)(Andrés Calamaro, Miguel Cantillo, Joaquín Sabina, Jaime Urrutia, Marcelo Scornik) - 3:15
Mi Gin Tonic (My Gin Tonic)(Andrés Calamaro, Cachorro López) - 2:53
La Espuma de las Orillas (The Spume from the Seasides)(Andrés Calamaro, Cachorro López) - 3:01
Cada una de tus Cosas (Each One Of Your Things)(Andrés Calamaro) - 3:29
Comedor Piquetero (Picketer Dining)(Andrés Calamaro) - 3:14
Sexy & Marikón (Sexy & Big-Bellied)(Andrés Calamaro, Cachorro López) - 3:37
De Orgullo y de Miedo (Of Proudness And Fear)(Andrés Calamaro) - 3:38
La Mitad del Amor (The Half Of The Love)(Andrés Calamaro, Cachorro López) - 3:45
Mi Cobain (Superjoint) (My Cobain (Superjoint))(Andrés Calamaro) - 2:40

Charts

Sales and certifications

References 

Andrés Calamaro albums
2007 albums
Albums produced by Cachorro López
Latin Grammy Award for Best Rock Solo Vocal Album